Come a Little Bit Closer is the third studio album by Jay and the Americans.

Reception
Editors at AllMusic Guide gave this album 3.5 out of five stars, with reviewer Bruce Eder callin it "an odd album" for how it collects random singles but is not a greatest hits album, characterizing it as "a slapped together effort" in order to capitalize on the success of "Come a Little Bit Closer" that features "good if not exceptional pop-rock".

Track listing

Side one
"Come a Little Bit Closer" – 2:30
"She Doesn't Know It" – 2:37
"Strangers Tomorrow" – 2:17
"What's the Use" – 2:50
"Only in America" – 2:23
"Look in My Eyes Maria" – 2:23

Side two
"To Wait for Love" – 2:14
"Friday" – 3:00
"This Is It" – 2:45
"Come Dance with Me" – 2:10
"Tomorrow" – 2:12
"Goodbye Boys Goodbye (Ciao Ragazzi Ciao)" - 2:00

References 

Jay and the Americans albums
1964 albums
United Artists Records albums